Andrew Collins is a British actor, best known for playing recurring character Jarrett Maxwell in the CBS soap opera The Bold and the Beautiful as well as appearing in Parenthood, The Newsroom and Gilmore Girls.

He is a regular performer in Big Finish Productions, where he stars as Barnabas Collins in the Dark Shadows audio dramas, various characters in Doctor Who, Gallifrey, Earthsearch, and Stargate SG-1.

In the UK, his stage name is Andy Coleman.

Personal life

Collins was born in the West Midlands, England and moved to America in the early 2000s. He is currently living in LA, and is married with two children.

Career 
Andrew Collins graduated from Guildford School of Acting and has worked extensively in theatre, film and television both in the United States and the United Kingdom. He was the star of a Spanish national commercial, as well as several commercials for the UK, and also works as a voice-over artist.

Collins currently plays Jarrett Maxwell on the CBS soap opera The Bold and the Beautiful and has been seen on The Newsroom, Parenthood, Gilmore Girls, Passions, The Young and the Restless, All My Children and the BBC’s Dangerfield, among others. He is a regular performer for Big Finish audio dramas, has played characters in Doctor Who, Gallifrey, Earthsearch, and Dark Shadows, from which he has earned a large following as the new incarnation of Barnabas Collins.

As a writer/performer he was a leading light of the cult London satire show, Newsrevue, as well as several other shows including The Smiling Assassins and Lounge Lizards in Love.

Film, television and audio credits

External links

The Bold and the Beautiful Website
Dark Shadows Audio Dramas

Notes 

British male soap opera actors
British expatriate male actors in the United States
Year of birth missing (living people)
Living people